Jonathan Brodzinski (born June 19, 1993) is an American professional ice hockey player for the Hartford Wolf Pack of the American Hockey League (AHL) while under contract to the New York Rangers of the National Hockey League (NHL). Brodzinski was selected by the Los Angeles Kings in the 5th round (148th overall) of the 2013 NHL Entry Draft.

Playing career

Amateur
Brodzinski attended Blaine High School where he was teammates with former Minnesota Wild center Nick Bjugstad. After high school, Brodzinski played two seasons in the USHL with the Fargo Force.

Brodzinski attended St. Cloud State University where he skated three seasons with the Huskies. As a Freshman he led all NCAA Freshman with 22 goals and as a Junior he was named to the 2014–15 NCHC All-Conference First Team. He finished his college career with 64 goals and 48 assists for 112 points in 120 games played.

Professional
On April 1, 2015, the Los Angeles Kings signed Brodzinski to a two-year entry-level contract. He was then assigned to the Kings AHL affiliate, the Ontario Reign.

On January 5, 2017, Brodzinski, and teammate Vincent LoVerde, were selected to compete in the 2017 AHL All-Star Game.

Brodzinski was called up to the Kings on March 23, 2017, and made his NHL debut on March 25, 2017, against the New York Rangers. When he debuted, he became the first Los Angeles Kings player to wear the number 76 and the first player who was part of the Kings 2013 draft class to appear in a game for the team.

Brodzinski was recalled to the NHL on November 16, 2017. He scored his first NHL goal on November 18, 2017, in a 4–0 win against the Florida Panthers. On January 7, 2018, he was reassigned to the AHL only to be recalled on January 14, after playing 3 games in the AHL since he was last recalled. He was demoted again on January 25, 2018, only to be recalled temporarily on January 29, 2018, along with 3 other teammates.

As a free agent from the Kings, Brodzinski signed a one-year, two-way contract with the San Jose Sharks on July 2, 2019. After making the Sharks opening night roster for the 2019–20 season, he appeared in three games for the club before he was placed on waivers on October 11, 2019. Assigned to AHL affiliate, the San Jose Barracuda, Brodzinski tallied 14 goals and 30 points in 44 games before the season was cancelled due to the COVID-19 pandemic.

On October 9, 2020, Brodzinski left the West Coast as a free agent in securing a one-year, two-way contract with the New York Rangers. On February 28, 2022, he signed a two-year contract extension with the Rangers.

Personal life
Brodzinski's younger brother, Michael, was taken just seven selections before him in the same NHL draft by the San Jose Sharks. The two brothers competed against each other multiple times during college as Michael played for the University of Minnesota. Brodzinski also has two more younger brothers, Easton and Bryce. Easton currently plays hockey for the Hartford Wolf Pack after playing college hockey for St. Cloud State University, while Bryce, who was a 7th round draft pick by the Philadelphia Flyers in 2019, plays hockey for the University of Minnesota. Bryce was also named 2019 Mr. Hockey for Minnesota High School Hockey.

Career statistics

Awards and honors

References

External links
 

1993 births
Living people
American men's ice hockey right wingers
Fargo Force players
Hartford Wolf Pack players
Ice hockey players from Minnesota
Los Angeles Kings draft picks
Los Angeles Kings players
New York Rangers players
Ontario Reign (AHL) players
People from Blaine, Minnesota
San Jose Barracuda players
San Jose Sharks players
St. Cloud State Huskies men's ice hockey players